Pabianka is a river of Poland, a tributary of the Dobrzynka in Pabianice.

Rivers of Poland
Rivers of Łódź Voivodeship